Ricardo José Rodríguez (born 4 January 1952) is an Argentine rower. He competed in the men's eight event at the 1972 Summer Olympics.

References

1952 births
Living people
Argentine male rowers
Olympic rowers of Argentina
Rowers at the 1972 Summer Olympics
Place of birth missing (living people)
Pan American Games medalists in rowing
Pan American Games gold medalists for Argentina
Pan American Games bronze medalists for Argentina
Rowers at the 1971 Pan American Games
Rowers at the 1975 Pan American Games
Medalists at the 1971 Pan American Games